The Emmerich Rhine Bridge is a suspension bridge located in Emmerich am Rhein, Germany. It is the longest suspension bridge in Germany.

Planning and construction 
It was built from 1962 to 1965, after the design of Heinrich Bartmann and the planning of German civil engineer . The bridge was opened for traffic in 1965. Pedestrian walkways and cycle paths run along both sides of the bridge, separated from the vehicular lanes.

Gallery

References 
 Klingenberg, Wilhelm (1962). Neubau einer Hängebrücke über den Rhein. Der Bauingenieur 37
 Beyer, Erwin; Thul, Heribert (1967). Hochstraßen. Beton-Verlag, (2nd ed.)

Further reading 
 Renault, Philippe; Butenweg, Christoph; Meskouris, Konstantin (2005). Beurteilung der Erdbebensicherheit von bestehenden Brückenbauwerken am Beispiel der Rheinbrücke Emmerich. In: Beton- und Stahlbetonbau. Vol. 100, No. 7, July 2005, p. 574–581

See also 
 List of bridges in Germany

External links 

 

Suspension bridges in Germany
Bridges over the Rhine
Bridges completed in 1965
Buildings and structures in Kleve (district)
Bridges in North Rhine-Westphalia